FC Porto Taibesse is a football club of East Timor from Taibesse in Dili (Vila de Lahane Oriental). The team currently dispute the second division of the LFA (Liga Futebol Amadora) and other competitions organized by the FFTL such as the Taça 12 de Novembro and the Copa FFTL.

Squad (2020)

Starting Players

1.Francisco Tilman(GK)
13.Edencio Costa
3.Claudio Araujo
14.Felis Gama
6.Octavio Mesquita
15.Armindo Almeida
5.Januario Pinto
7.Marcelinho Fernandes
8.David Correia
9.Lazio Piedade
10.Felipe Cruz

Head Coach:
Luis Simoes

Updated in 2020.

Reserve players

30.Marcos Gutierrez (GK)
21.João Guteres
12.Hun Sen Klau
17.Romer Martins
19.Frederico Sila
23.Jerico Piedade
8.Thomas Elo

Competition records

Super Liga 
2005-06: 2nd Round

Liga Futebol Amadora 
2016: 3rd place

Taça 12 de Novembro
2016: 1st Round

Affiliated Clubs
 FC Porto
 FC Porto de Macau
 FC Porto Real
 FC Celsi

References

External links
FC Porto Taibesse at national-football-teams.com
Facebook page

Football clubs in East Timor
Football
Association football clubs established in 1938
Sport in Dili
1930s establishments in Portuguese Timor